Bozi may refer to:
Boží Dar, town
Bozi, Ivory Coast, town
Bozi Boziana, Congolese guitarist and singer
Bozi Jan, village
Bozi, Iran, village
Bozi, Fars, Iran, village
Qaleh Bozi, cave complex
Met Bozi, member of parliament

Other
 Boji (disambiguation)